Jeffrey "Jeff" Bushell is an American screenwriter who has written for The Bernie Mac Show, Drawn Together, MADtv, What I Like About You, and Zoey 101.  He created and wrote the film Beverly Hills Chihuahua which was inspired by his dog, Maggie. Bushell won the Peabody Award and the Television Critics Award for his work on The Bernie Mac Show.

He was born on April 8 in New Jersey.

He is a graduate of Middlebury College where he won the Stolley Ryan award for top American literature student.

He also co-created the Nickelodeon sitcom, Marvin Marvin, which premiered on November 24, 2012.

References

External links

Year of birth missing (living people)
Living people
American television writers
American male screenwriters
Middlebury College alumni
Peabody Award winners
American male television writers